Adeseyi Shinobu Adeyinka "Seyi" Adekoya (born December 5, 1995) is an American soccer player who plays as a forward.

Career

Youth, college and amateur
A product of Lakeside School (Seattle), Adekoya spent his youth career with Crossfire Premier from 2011 to 2013 and with the Seattle Sounders FC academy from 2013 to 2014 before signing a letter of intent to play college soccer at UCLA.  He made a total of 55 appearances for the Bruins and finished with 20 goals and eight assists.

He also played in the Premier Development League for FC Golden State Force.

Professional
On January 17, 2017, Adekoya signed a homegrown player contract with Seattle Sounders FC, making him the ninth homegrown signing in club history.  On March 26, 2017, he made his professional debut for USL affiliate club Seattle Sounders FC 2 in a 2–1 loss to Sacramento Republic.  Adekoya scored his first professional goal on April 2, 2017, playing for Sounders FC 2 in a 2–1 win over Timbers 2.  Adekoya made his first start for Seattle Sounders FC on May 31, 2017, in a 3–0 defeat to the Columbus Crew. His release from the team was announced on April 3, 2018.

In June 2018, Adekoya moved to Danish Superliga side Vendsyssel FF. In January 2020, Adekoya moved to Maltese Premier League side Balzan. He returned to Denmark in October 2020, signing a contract until December 2020 for third-tier Danish 2nd Division club Thisted FC. On April 1, 2021, Adekoya joined USL Championship club Phoenix Rising FC. On August 6, 2021, Adekoya moved on loan to USL Championship side OKC Energy for the remainder of the season.

References

External links

UCLA bio
USSF Development Academy bio

1995 births
Living people
American people of Yoruba descent
American soccer players
American expatriate soccer players
UCLA Bruins men's soccer players
FC Golden State Force players
Homegrown Players (MLS)
Seattle Sounders FC players
Tacoma Defiance players
Vendsyssel FF players
Balzan F.C. players
Thisted FC players
Phoenix Rising FC players
OKC Energy FC players
USL League Two players
Major League Soccer players
Danish Superliga players
Danish 1st Division players
Danish 2nd Division players
USL Championship players
Maltese Premier League players
Association football forwards
Soccer players from Seattle
American expatriate sportspeople in Denmark
American expatriate sportspeople in Malta
Expatriate men's footballers in Denmark
Expatriate footballers in Malta